The Hypoptopomatinae are a subfamily of catfishes (order Siluriformes) of the family Loricariidae, composed of 17 genera and approximately 80 species. This subfamily represents about one-tenth of all loricariid species.

It has been divided into two tribes, Hypoptopomatini and Otothyrini. However, in a 2005 analysis, Otothyrini was found to not be monophyletic, with its representatives comprising a paraphyletic group in relation to the tribe Hypoptopomatini. More recent phylogenetic evidence shows that Hypoptopomatini and Otothyrini, while each are monophyletic tribes, do not form a monophyletic subfamily, and therefore should each be recognized as their own individual subfamilies. Problematically, the most recent hypoptopomatine genera, Gymnotocinclus and Rhinolekos, were not classified in either of the tribes.

Almost all species of Hypoptopomatinae have a diploid number of 2n = 54; this group is karyotypically very conserved.

Hypoptopomatinae are distributed east of the Andes in South America from Venezuela to northern Argentina. Most of the hypoptopomatine species are usually found at or near the water surface, typically in close association with riverbank vegetation or some subsurface structure.

References

Loricariidae
Taxa named by Rosa Smith Eigenmann
Taxa named by Carl H. Eigenmann
Fish subfamilies